Barrett Watten (born October 3, 1948) is an American poet, editor, and educator often associated with the Language poets. He is a professor of English at Wayne State University in Detroit, Michigan where he has taught modernism and cultural studies. Other areas of research include postmodern culture and American literature; poetics; literary and cultural theory; visual studies; the avant-garde; and digital literature.

Watten is married to the poet Carla Harryman; their son, Asa, was born in 1984.

Early life and education
Watten was born in Long Beach, California in 1948. After graduating from high school in Oakland, California, he studied at MIT and the University of California, Berkeley. He majored in biochemistry, graduating with an AB in 1969. But he had also met poets such as Robert Grenier and Ron Silliman and studied with Josephine Miles in the English department. He enrolled in the Iowa Writers' Workshop at the University of Iowa in Iowa City, Iowa. In 1971 he and Grenier began the poetry journal This. which he edited with Grenier for the first three years and then alone until 1982. He graduated with a master's in fine arts degree in 1972.

Career
After graduation Watten returned to the San Francisco Bay area. He continued to publish This on his own and became involved in the early stages of language poetry which was developing there. In 1976 he and friends founded a reading series at the Grand Piano coffeehouse in San Francisco which ran through 1979. From 2006 to 2010 the group published The Grand Piano, a "collective autobiography" of that period. Watten continued to edit This until 1982. Then he and Lyn Hejinian founded and edited Poetics Journal from 1982 to 1993.

In 1986 Watten returned to graduate school at Berkeley and received his PhD in English in 1995. He joined the English department at Wayne State University in 1994. In 1995 he was the subject of a special issue of the poetry magazine Aerial. The American Comparative Literature Association awarded him the 2004 René Wellek Prize for his book The Constructivist Moment: From Material Text to Cultural Poetics.

As outlined in a report in The Chronicle of Higher Education, over the years Watten's behavior, allegedly short-tempered and hostile, had made many students and faculty uncomfortable. In the spring semester of 2019 several graduate students filed new complaints. Unhappy with the response, they set up a blog to collect accounts of his behavior toward students and faculty. In May the Wayne State administration hired an independent investigator. In November the university informed Watten that he was banned from teaching and his office would be moved to another building. Watten's faculty union, the American Association of University Professors (AAUP), filed a grievance citing lack of required due process and requesting that the restrictions be withdrawn.

Major work
Watten edited This, one of the central little magazines of the Language movement, and co-edited Poetics Journal, one of its theoretical venues. In 1986, he returned to UC Berkeley, earning his PhD in English in 1996. His published work includes Bad History (1998) and Frame (1971–1990) which appeared in 1997. Frame brings together six previously published works of poetry from two decades: Opera—Works ; Decay ; 1–10 ; Plasma/Paralleles/"X" ;                                                                                                                                                                                 Complete Thought and Conduit – along with two previously uncollected texts – City Fields and Frame. Two of his books – Progress (1985) and Under Erasure (1991) –  were republished with a new preface, as Progress | Under Erasure (2004).

Watten is co-author, with Michael Davidson, Lyn Hejinian, and Ron Silliman, of Leningrad: American Writers in the Soviet Union (1991). He has published three volumes of literary and cultural criticism, Total Syntax (1985);The Constructivist Moment: From Material Text to Cultural Poetics (2003);  and Questions of Poetics: Language Writing and Consequences (2016). Watten earned his PhD at the University of California at Berkeley in 1995. His dissertation was entitled: Horizon Shift: Progress and Negativity in American Modernism. In 2007, Martin Richet translated into French Plasma / Parallèles / «X», a volume that joins three long poems which originally appeared in a chapbook by Tuumba Press in 1979.

Watten is also co-author, with Tom Mandel, Lyn Hejinian, Ron Silliman, Kit Robinson, Carla Harryman, Rae Armantrout, Ted Pearson, Steve Benson, and Bob Perelman  of The Grand Piano: An Experiment in Collective Autobiography. (Detroit, MI: Mode A/This Press, 2006–2010). This work, which consists of ten volumes, is described as an "experiment in collective autobiography by ten writers identified with Language poetry in San Francisco. The project takes its name from a coffeehouse at 1607 Haight Street, where from 1976 to 1979 the authors curated a reading and performance series. The project began in 1998; it was constructed via online collaboration, using Web-based software and an email listserv.

Bibliography 

 Total Syntax (1985)
 
 Frame, 1971-1990 (1997) - a compilation of:
 Opera—Works
 Decay 
 1–10 
 Plasma/Paralleles/"X"
 Complete Thought and Conduit
 City Fields
 Frame
 Bad History (1998)
 The Constructivist Moment: From Material Text to Cultural Poetics (2003)
 Progress | Under Erasure (2004) - a compilation of:
 Progress (1985) 
 Under Erasure (1991) 
 Watten, Barrett et al. The Grand Piano: An Experiment in Collective Autobiography. (Detroit, MI: Mode A/This Press, 2006–2010). 10 vols.
 Questions of Poetics: Language Writing and Consequences (2016)

Critical studies and reviews of Watten's work
Leningrad

References

Further reading

External links
Faculty webpage
Barrett Watten.net
The Grand Piano

American male poets
Language poets
Writers from Long Beach, California
1948 births
Living people
American literary critics
Wayne State University faculty
University of California, Berkeley alumni
University of Iowa alumni
Iowa Writers' Workshop alumni
American magazine founders
American male non-fiction writers